The River Bray is a small river in North Devon, England. It is a tributary of the River Mole, which in turn is a tributary of the River Taw. It rises in Exmoor, near the border with Somerset.

Geology
Generally, the River is quite shallow, but it can be prone to flooding. In the Lynmouth Flood, the River Bray was affected by the unseasonably high rainfall, and burst its banks, killing a group of schoolboy campers at Filleigh.

Villages
Several villages, such as Brayford, have had their name given from the River Bray.

References

Bray
2Bray